Karl-Heinrich Riewe was a German physicist. After World War II, he was sent to Russia to work on the Soviet atomic bomb project.  After going on strike at a defense related facility in 1948, he was accused of sabotage. He was sentenced to 25 years in the GULAG and disappeared.

Career

In Germany

In June 1941, Riewe co-authored a paper electron optics and plasma physics with the nuclear physicist Fritz Houtermans.  At this time, Houtermans is known to have been at the Forschungslaboratoriums für Elektronenphysik (Research Laboratory for Electron Physics), a private laboratory of Manfred von Ardenne, in Berlin-Lichterfelde. The paper cites the two as being at a facility in Berlin; other papers by Riewe, three years earlier (see below), cited him as being at a facility in the community of Berlin-Wilmersdorf, which is in the vicinity of Berlin-Lichterfelde.

In Russia

Near the close of World War II, the Soviet Union sent special search teams into Germany to locate and deport German nuclear scientists or any others who could be of use to the Soviet atomic bomb project.  The Russian Alsos teams were headed by NKVD Colonel General A. P. Zavenyagin and staffed with numerous scientists, from their only nuclear laboratory, attired in NKVD officer's uniforms. The main search team, headed by Colonel General Zavenyagin, arrived in Berlin on 3 May, the day after Russia announced the fall of Berlin to their military forces; it included Colonel General V. A. Makhnjov, and nuclear physicists Yulij Borisovich Khariton, Isaak Konstantinovich Kikoin, and Lev Andreevich Artsimovich. Targets on the top of their list were the physics facilities in Berlin and its environs.

Riewe was sent to the Russia to work on the Soviet atomic bomb project, at  Heinz Pose's Laboratory V in Obninsk, either in the initial sweep by the special search teams or later by Pose's six-month recruitment trip, from March to August 1946, with NKVD General Kravchenko and two other officers.

In 1948, two scientists at Laboratory V, Riewe and Dr. Renger, went on strike for reasons of their work conditions or hoping to be sent back to Germany after their two-year contracts expired.  As their actions where while working on a defense project, they were accused of being ring-leaders of sabotage and imprisoned.  Riewe received a sentence of 25 years in the Soviet GULAG and disappeared.  Tamara Andrjuschenko recalled hearing that Riewe had been executed for sabotage.

Postscript

Riewe's widow moved to Sukhumi, where at that time there was workforce of 300 Germans working at  Manfred von Ardenne's Laboratory A, in Sinop, a suburb of Sukhumi.  She eventually married the German draftsman Willi Lange. In 1950, Lange, his wife, Lange's daughter Hannelora, and his wife's children by Riewe, moved to Sungul', where he worked at  Nikolaus Riehl's Laboratory B, also known under another cover name, Объект 0211 (Ob'ekt 0211, Object 0211). After 1953, they were quarantined in the Agudzery (Agudseri) transition camp, after which Germans returned to Germany.
K.Riewe was in the gulag in the city of Dzhezkazgan, Kazakh SSR. After the death of I.V. Talin, his wife and daughter Christiane (bon 19/04/1942y.) From the city of Sukhumi returned to Germany. After some time, her husband returned, Karl Riewi He survived the Soviet labor camp and survived. The family settled in western Germany, in the city of Hanau, where they lived for the rest of their lives. Died Karl-H-Riewe in early 199? year. After a while, his wife died. Karl After returning, he worked in various positions: he helped as a scientific secretary organize and hold world congresses of physicists-nuclear engineers. For a long time he worked as the head of the patent office in Hanau.Daughter Christiane Riewe-Talwar is still alive. Lives in the Host/Odenwald area
The death of Karla Riewe in Soviet captivity was erroneous. I have been friends with his daughter for a long time and she told me this.

Selected literature

Karl-Heinrich Riewe Über eine thermodynamische Berechnung der Ionisation, Zeitschrift für Physik, Volume 107, Issue 9-10, 680-682 (1937). The author is identified as being in Berlin-Wilmersdorf. Submitted 2 November 1937.
Karl-Heinrich Riewe Die Zustandssumme eines Dissoziationsvorganges, Zeitschrift für Physik Volume 109, Numbers 11-12, 753-757 (1938).  The author is identified as being in Berlin-Wilmersdorf.  Submitted 27 April 1938.
Karl-Heinrich Riewe Über eine neue thermodynamische Berechnung des Dissoziationsgrades, Zeitschrift für Physik Volume 110, Numbers 5-6, 393-394 (1938). The author is identified as being in Berlin-Wilmersdorf.  Submitted 20 July 1938.
Fritz G. Houtermans and Karl-Heinrich Riewe Über die Raumladungswirkung an einem Strahl geladener Teilchen von rechteckigem Querschnitt der Blende, Archiv für Elektrotechnik Volume 35, Number 11, 686-691 (1941).  The authors are identified as being in Berlin. Submitted 5 June 1941.

Bibliography

Maddrell, Paul Spying on Science: Western Intelligence in Divided Germany 1945–1961 (Oxford, 2006) 
Naimark, Norman M. The Russians in Germany: A History of the Soviet Zone of Occupation, 1945-1949 (Hardcover - Aug 11, 1995) Belknap
Oleynikov, Pavel V. German Scientists in the Soviet Atomic Project, The Nonproliferation Review Volume 7, Number 2, 1 – 30  (2000).  The author has been a group leader at the Institute of Technical Physics of the Russian Federal Nuclear Center in Snezhinsk (Chelyabinsk-70).

Notes

20th-century German physicists
Nuclear weapons program of the Soviet Union